Millishraju or Millisraju is a mountain in the Cordillera Blanca in the Andes of Peru.

References 

Mountains of Ancash Region